Flavobacterium cauense is a Gram-negative and rod-shaped bacterium from the genus of Flavobacterium which has been isolated from sediments of the Taihu Lake in China.
Colonies of Flavobacterium cauense on R2a agar have been reported to be yellowish orange.

References

External links
Type strain of Flavobacterium cauense at BacDive -  the Bacterial Diversity Metadatabase

 

cauense
Bacteria described in 2009